The following is a timeline of the COVID-19 pandemic in Guangdong for the year 2020.

January
On the morning of January 11, 2020, a 41-year-old Indian female patient with severe pneumonia was admitted to Shekou People's Hospital in Nanshan District, Shenzhen, Guangdong. At the time, the patient, Mahe Shwari, was a teacher at Keai International School in Shekou. The patient had been experiencing a cough and fever for a week prior to admission, and had severe respiratory failure after being admitted. On January 12, the Shenzhen Municipal Health Commission (SMHC)[zh] issued an statement saying that Shwari's symptoms had nothing to do with the 2019 coronavirus disease. Shenzhen Third People's Hospital[zh] also accommodated two patients who were experiencing similar symptoms.

On January 19, the National Health and Medical Commission[zh] confirmed the first case of pneumonia caused by a new type of coronavirus infection in the Guangdong Province. The patient was a 66-year-old male who lived in Shenzhen. He went to Wuhan to visit relatives on 20 December 2019. He developed symptoms such as fever and fatigue on 3 January 2020. He returned to Shenzhen on January 4 for medical treatment, and was transferred to Shenzhen on January 11. After being tested by the provincial and municipal Center for Disease Control (CDCP)[zh] with a detection kit, results showed evidence for a new coronavirus nucleic acid. On January 18, the specimen was sent to the China's Center for Disease Control for viral nucleic acid testing and the prior result was corroborated. On January 19, experts from the diagnostic team under the Epidemic Leading Group of the National Health Commission evaluated and confirmed the case based on the contents of the "Diagnosis and Treatment Plan for Pneumonia Infected by Novel Coronavirus (Trial Version 2)", and the expert group unanimously agreed that the case was a case of pneumonia caused by the new coronavirus. Shenzhen Municipal Health Commision released a statement that said another 8 observation cases in Shenzhen were being treated in isolation at designated hospitals, and follow-up investigations and medical observations would later confirm those as cases of the new Coronavirus..

At 8:00 PM on January 20, the Guangdong Provincial Health Commission announced that 13 new cases had emerged in Guangdong Province (including 8 cases in Shenzhen, 3 cases in Zhuhai, 1 case in Zhanjiang, and 1 case in Huizhou).

The three cases in Zhuhai were a family of three. The parents took the high-speed train from Wuhan to their daughter's home in Zhuhai on January 11. On January 15, the father felt unwell and went to the doctor. On January 17, he was initially diagnosed as a suspected case and transferred to the Fifth Hospital of CUHK for isolation treatment. He and his daughter successively developed a fever and other symptoms, and were transferred from medical observation to isolation treatment on January 18.

At 10:00 PM on January 21, the Guangdong Provincial Health Commission issued an announcement stating that there were 3 new confirmed cases of coronavirus-related pneumonia in, Shenzhen, Zhuhai, and Zhanjiang. Among the three patients, 2 women and 1 man, with all 3 confirmed to have recently traveled to Hubei.

At 12:00 PM on January 21, 9 new confirmed cases of pneumonia with new coronavirus infection were reported in Guangdong Province (2 cases in Guangzhou, 4 cases in Shenzhen, 1 case in Foshan, 2 cases in Shaoguan; 4 cases were males and 5 cases were females). Two severe cases were treated in isolation at local designated medical institutions. Among them, 7 cases have a history of residence or travel in Hubei, and a total of 26 cases in the province.

From 00:00 to 24:00 on January 22, Guangdong Province reported 6 new confirmed cases. Among them, Zhongshan and Zhaoqing each had 1 case (the first confirmed case), the others were 3 cases in Guangzhou and 1 case in Shenzhen. As of 24:00 on January 22, a total of 32 cases have been confirmed in the province, including 12 severe cases, 3 critical cases, and no deaths.

On January 23, two patients with pneumonia infected by the new coronavirus in Shenzhen recovered and were discharged from the hospital. The discharged patients were a 35-year-old male patient and a 10-year-old boy patient, both confirmed cases reported by the Guangdong Provincial Health Commission.

On January 24, Guangdong Province reported 21 new confirmed cases of new coronavirus-infected pneumonia, including 3 cases in Yangjiang (first report), 1 case in Qingyuan (first report), 2 cases in Guangzhou, 4 cases in Zhuhai, and 5 cases in Foshan. , 1 case in Shaoguan, 4 cases in Huizhou, 1 case in Zhongshan.

February
On February 1, the Guangdong Provincial Health Commission reported that there were 127 new confirmed cases in Guangdong Province on January 31. Among the newly confirmed cases, 3 were reported for the first time in Chaozhou; 60 in Shenzhen, 31 in Guangzhou, 12 in Zhuhai, 6 in Foshan, 5 in Dongguan, 3 in Huizhou, 2 in Shantou, and 2 in Jiangmen. 1 case, 2 cases in Zhanjiang City, 1 case in Shanwei City. On the afternoon of the same day, 15 new confirmed cases were reported from 0-12 o'clock on the 1st, and 1 new case was discharged. Among the newly confirmed cases, 13 were in Guangzhou, 1 in Foshan, and 1 in Meizhou.

On February 2, the Guangdong Provincial Health and Health Commission reported that there were 84 new confirmed cases in Guangdong Province on February 1. Among the newly confirmed cases, 38 were in Guangzhou, 26 in Shenzhen, 6 in Dongguan, and 3 in Zhuhai. 3 cases in Zhongshan City, 3 cases in Huizhou City, 1 case in Zhaoqing City, 1 case in Zhanjiang City, 1 case in Shaoguan City, 1 case in Meizhou City, and 1 case in Foshan City. On the afternoon of the same day, 28 new confirmed cases were reported in the province from 0–12 on the 2nd. Among the newly confirmed cases, 11 were in Shenzhen, 6 in Zhuhai, 4 in Guangzhou, 4 in Foshan, 1 in Shantou, 1 in Meizhou, and 1 in Chaozhou.

October
On October 1, Guangdong Province added 2 newly imported confirmed cases, reported from Guangzhou, from the Philippines.

On October 2, Guangdong Province reported 3 newly imported confirmed cases, Guangzhou reported 2 cases, from Guinea and Côte d'Ivoire respectively; Zhanjiang reported 1 case, from the Philippines.

On October 3, 6 newly imported confirmed cases were confirmed in Guangdong Province. Guangzhou reported that 3 cases were from Bangladesh, and the remaining 3 cases were from Guinea, Kenya, and Ecuador.

On October 4, 1 newly imported confirmed case in Guangdong Province, reported from Guangzhou, came from the UK.

On October 5, Guangdong Province reported 5 newly imported confirmed cases, Guangzhou reported 4 cases from the United Kingdom, the United Arab Emirates, the Philippines, and Tanzania; Foshan reported 1 case from Argentina.

On October 6, Guangdong Province added 2 newly imported confirmed cases.

November
On November 1, Guangdong Province added 5 newly imported confirmed cases, reported from Guangzhou, 2 cases each from the Philippines and Jordan, and 1 case from Canada.

On November 2, 8 newly imported confirmed cases were imported from Guangdong Province. Guangzhou reported that 2 cases came from Bangladesh, and the remaining 6 cases came from India, Uganda, Ethiopia, Poland, the Democratic Republic of the Congo, and Argentina.

On November 3, 3 newly imported confirmed cases in Guangdong Province were reported from Guangzhou, from Benin, Turkey, and the United Arab Emirates.

On November 5, 3 newly imported confirmed cases in Guangdong Province were reported from Guangzhou, 2 cases were from Bangladesh, and 1 case was from Kenya.

On November 6, 2 newly imported confirmed cases in Guangdong Province were reported from Guangzhou, from Nepal and Palestine respectively.

On November 7, 2 newly imported confirmed cases in Guangdong Province were reported from Guangzhou, from Egypt and the Philippines respectively.

On November 8, 4 newly imported confirmed cases in Guangdong Province were reported from Guangzhou, 2 cases were from the UK, 1 case was from the Democratic Republic of the Congo, and 1 case was from the Philippines.

On November 9, 6 newly imported confirmed cases were imported from Guangdong Province. Guangzhou reported 2 cases from Ethiopia and the remaining 4 cases from Mali, the Philippines, Kenya, and Hungary.

On November 11, 1 newly imported confirmed case in Guangdong Province, reported from Guangzhou, came from the United States.

On November 13, there were 7 newly imported confirmed cases in Guangdong Province. Guangzhou reported that 2 cases were from Mali, and the remaining 5 cases were from Indonesia, Nepal, Tanzania, Ethiopia, and Iran.

On November 14, there were 3 newly imported confirmed cases in Guangdong Province, reported in Guangzhou, from the Philippines, the Democratic Republic of the Congo, and Iran.

On November 15, 2 newly imported confirmed cases were imported from Guangdong Province, reported in Guangzhou, from the United Kingdom and Nepal.

On November 16, 3 newly imported confirmed cases in Guangdong Province were reported from Guangzhou, from the United Kingdom, the United Arab Emirates, and Panama.

On November 17, 1 newly imported confirmed case in Guangdong Province, reported from Guangzhou, came from Mali.

On November 18, 1 newly imported confirmed case in Guangdong Province, reported from Guangzhou, came from Indonesia.

On November 19, 2 newly imported confirmed cases in Guangdong Province were reported from Guangzhou, one from the United States and one from Madagascar.

On November 22, Guangdong Province reported 4 newly imported confirmed cases, Guangzhou reported 2 cases from Iraq, and Maoming reported 2 cases from Malaysia.

On November 23, Guangdong Province reported 4 newly imported confirmed cases, Guangzhou reported 3 cases, 2 cases were from the Democratic Republic of the Congo, and 1 case was from Uganda; Maoming reported 1 case from Malaysia.

On November 24, 1 newly imported confirmed case in Guangdong Province was reported from Guangzhou and came from Iraq.

On November 25, Guangdong Province reported 4 newly imported confirmed cases, Guangzhou reported 2 cases, each from the United States and Indonesia, and Yangjiang reported 2 cases, both from Egypt.

On November 29, 1 newly imported confirmed case in Guangdong Province, reported from Guangzhou, came from Morocco.

References

2020 in Guangdong

zh:2019冠状病毒病广东省疫情时间线 (2020年)